Thanjavur has a culture of education. It is home to the Saraswati Mahal Library which dates back to the end of the 16th century and contains over 30,000 rare manuscripts. It has now been fully computerized. There are many other libraries including The Central Library, Thanjavur. Currently, Thanjavur has four universities including Tamil University and several colleges including the Thanjavur Medical College and RVS Agricultural College. There are also many research centres, including the Paddy Processing Research Centre (Now Indian Institute of Crop Processing Technology) and Soil and Water Research Centre and also have Agricultural college and research institute.

Universities 

 Indian Institute of Food Processing Technology IIFPT
 Periyar Maniammai University
 PRIST University
 SASTRA University
 Tamil University
 TANUVAS TJ Campus

Engineering Colleges 

 Government Engineering College, Thanjavur
 Anjalai Ammal Mahalingam Engineering College (AAMEC)
 Kings Engineering College (KEC)
 KSK College of Engineering & Technology (KSKCET)
 St.Joseph's College of Engineering & Technology (DMI)
 Annai College of Engineering and Technology (ACET)
 Arasu Engineering College (AEC)
 Parisutham Institute of Technology & Science (PITS)
 University engineering college (constituent college of Anna University)
 Star lion college of engineering and technology
  PR engineering college
 Vandayar engineering college
 As-salam college of engineering and technology
 SMR east coast college of engineering & technology

Medical Colleges 

 Thanjavur Medical College (Fourth Medical College in Tamil Nadu started in 1959

paramedical college 
 Mannai Narayanasamy College of Physioterapy

Arts, Science and Management Studies 

 Adaikkala Madha College of Arts and Science
 Ruskin International B-School & Aviation Academy
 Bharath College of Science and Management
 Bon Secours College for Women
 Khadir Mohideen College
 Marudupandiyar College of Arts and Science
 Rajah's College of Sanskrit and Tamil Studies
 Sami Arul College of Arts and Science
 Indian Institute of Catering Technology and Hotel Management
 Annai Vailankanni Arts and science college
 T.U.K. Arts College (Karanthai Tamil Sangam)
 Abi and Abi College

Autonomous Colleges 

 A.V.V.M Sri Pushpam college, Poondi
 Kunthavai Naacchiyaar Government Arts College for Women
 Rajah Serfoji Government College Thanjavur 
 Government Arts College, Kumbakonam 
 Government College for Women, Kumbakonam

Schools 
Jamewrekn international school#1. School in Thanjavur
 Maxwell Matriculation Higher Secondary School (MMHSS) (Established in 1989)
 Don Bosco Higher Secondary School
 E D Thomas Memorial Higher Secondary School
 Kalyanasundaram Higher Secondary School (KHSS) (Established in 1891)
 Rajahs Higher Secondary School (RHSS)
 St. Antony's Higher Secondary School
 Kamala Subramaniam Matriculation School (KSMS)
 Allwin Matriculation and Higher Secondary School (AMHSS)
  Auxilium Girls Higher Secondary School Thanjavur
 Seventh Day Adventist Secondary School
 csi blake higher secondary school
 St. Peter's higher secondary school(Established in 1784)
 Morning star matriculation school
 Amrita Vidyalayam
 Oriental higher secondary school
 Little scholars matric. Higher secondary school
 Thamarai international school
 Christ international school
 Nav bharat matric.hr.sec. school
 Kalaimagal matric.hr.sec. school
 Vidya vikas matric.hr.sec. school
 Veeraraghava higher secondary school
 St. Joseph girls Higher secondary school
 Sacred heart girls higher secondary school
 St Joseph matriculation school
 Don Bosco Matric Higher Secondary School Punalvasal Pattukkottai
 Thamarai International school
 Ranis International Nursery and Primary School 
 SDV Matriculation School

Polytechnic Colleges
 Ramya Sathianathan Polytechnic and B.Ed College
 Manali Ramakrishna Polytechnic College - Vayalur
 Shanmuga polytechnic college
 Periyar Centenary Polytechnic College

References 

Tamil Nadu education-related lists
Education in Thanjavur